The Black Dahlia (1987) is a crime fiction novel by American author James Ellroy. Its subject is the 1947 murder of Elizabeth Short in Los Angeles, California, which received wide attention because her corpse was horrifically mutilated and discarded in an empty residential lot. The investigation ultimately led to a broad police corruption scandal. While rooted in the facts of the Short murder and featuring many real-life people, places and events, Ellroy's novel blends facts and fiction, most notably in providing a solution to the crime when in reality it has never been solved. James Ellroy dedicated The Black Dahlia, "To Geneva Hilliker Ellroy 1915-1958 Mother: Twenty-nine Years Later, This Valediction in Blood." The epigraph for The Black Dahlia is "Now I fold you down, my drunkard, my navigator, My first lost keeper, to love and look at later. -Anne Sexton."

This book is considered the one that gained Ellroy critical attention as a serious writer of literature, expanding his renown beyond the crime novels of his early career. The Black Dahlia is the first book in Ellroy's L.A. Quartet, a cycle of novels set in 1940s and 1950s Los Angeles. He portrays the city in this period as a hotbed of political corruption and depravity. The Quartet continues with The Big Nowhere, L.A. Confidential, and White Jazz.

Synopsis

Prologue
In 1941, light heavyweight boxer Dwight "Bucky" Bleichert joins the LAPD in order to avoid being conscripted so that he can look after his dementia-addled father. However, when his father's membership in the German American Bund is discovered, Bucky is forced to inform on two Japanese-American friends and is wracked with guilt when they are sent to an internment camp. Bucky meets Lee Blanchard, another boxer-turned-cop who made his name by proving that violent pimp Bobby De Witt was the mastermind behind a notorious bank heist. Lee is openly cohabiting with Kay Lake, De Witt's girlfriend, in violation of LAPD policy.

Part 1: Fire and Ice
In 1946, Bucky is promoted to a plainclothes job in the Warrants Division, with Lee as his partner. Bucky quickly forms a close bond with Lee and Kay, seeing them as a surrogate family. Kay becomes attracted to Bucky and attempts to seduce him, revealing that her relationship with Lee is platonic, but Bucky nevertheless rebuffs her advances in order to avoid upsetting the harmonious friendship between the three of them. Bucky and Lee attract further publicity after shooting dead four hoodlums in a public gunfight.

Part 2: 39th and Norton
Five days after the shootout, the hideously mutilated body of Elizabeth Short, dubbed the "Black Dahlia", is discovered and becomes a media sensation. The killing reminds Lee of the unsolved disappearance of his younger sister Laurie, causing him to have himself and Bucky seconded to the team working the case. Fritz Vogel, a thuggish detective on the team, acts as a henchman for Assistant DA Ellis Loew, who sees the Dahlia case as a way to launch his political career. Loew and Vogel repeatedly try to frame innocent men in order to close the case quickly. Bucky is initially resentful of his and Lee's involvement in the case, but gradually becomes obsessed with Short as he learns about her chaotic life as a transient who had affairs with multiple men.

One line of enquiry leads Bucky to Madeleine Sprague, a spoiled socialite who closely resembles Short and was also a lesbian lover of hers. In exchange for Bucky suppressing evidence about her involvement with Short, Madeleine has sex with him, causing him to fantasize that she is Short. Bucky meets the rest of Madeleine's family, comprising her tyrannical father Emmett, an amoral property developer; her sickly mother Ramona; and her sister Martha, an aspiring artist. He also learns about George Tilden, an old friend of Emmett's who was mutilated in a car crash and subsequently became an itinerant handyman living in empty Sprague properties.

Over the next few days, Lee becomes increasingly unstable, his obsession over the Dahlia case compounded by nervousness at the news that Bobby De Witt is about to be released. When Bucky finds a pornographic film featuring Short, Lee flies into a rage and absconds to Tijuana, ostensibly to track down the man who made the film. Bucky follows and discovers that the newly released De Witt is also in Tijuana. Before Bucky can find Lee, De Witt is murdered along with Mexican drug trafficker Felix Chasco, apparently by corrupt Rurales hired by Lee, though the Mexican police pin the blame on local thugs. Lee fails to reappear and Bucky returns to Los Angeles.

Bucky discovers that Vogel has been suppressing evidence because, a few days before Short's death, she had been hired as a prostitute by his son Johnny. Vogel commits suicide after Bucky forces Johnny to confess to soliciting and obstruction of justice. As a result, Bucky is placed on two weeks' leave. He uses the time off to return to Mexico to look for Lee, and eventually learns from a San Diego private investigator that Lee was murdered with an axe soon after De Witt's death by an unknown Mexican woman in an act of revenge. With the PI's help, Bucky finds Lee's corpse buried under the beach at Ensenada.

Bucky reports the news of Lee's death to Kay, who reveals that De Witt wasn't actually involved in the bank robbery for which he was convicted; Lee was the ringleader of the heist and subsequently framed De Witt in order to prevent him from abusing Kay. When the only other survivor of the heist, a certain Baxter Fitch, threatened to tell all, Lee deliberately started the gunfight to eliminate him. Bucky is horrified by these revelations but forgives Lee and marries Kay. He ends his relationship with Madeleine and temporarily puts the Dahlia case behind him.

Part 3: Kay and Madeleine
After returning from his leave, Bucky is transferred to the LAPD's forensics unit. Over the next two years, his initially happy marriage with Kay gradually deteriorates. Bucky is eventually assigned to collect evidence surrounding the suicide of Eldridge Chambers, a former friend of Emmett Sprague. At Chambers' house he sees a painting of a grotesque clown with a Glasgow smile, similar to Short's facial mutilations, and learns more about the Sprague family from Chambers' widow. His interest in the Dahlia case piqued again, Bucky stakes out the Sprague mansion and discovers that Madeleine is frequently making herself up to look like Short and picking up sailors in the same bars which Short once frequented. Bucky confronts Madeleine, who explains that she has been mimicking Short in order to lure Bucky to her, having developed a sexual fixation on him. The two renew their affair, causing Kay to leave Bucky when she finds out.

Part 4: Elizabeth
While acting as security at a pageant to celebrate the removal of the last four letters of the "Hollywoodland" sign, former detective Harry Sears discovers a nearby shack containing a mattress covered in dried blood. He calls in Bucky, who from a forensic examination determines that the shack is where Short was tortured and killed. Bucky learns that the shack is owned by Emmett Sprague and, remembering that George Tilden lives in empty Sprague properties, discovers that fingerprints from the shack match Tilden's.

Bucky confronts Madeleine and Emmett, discovering in the process that they are lovers. Holding them at gunpoint, he forces the pair to admit their roles in the Dahlia case. He learns that Tilden, the son of an anatomist, was obsessed with dead bodies and habitually exhumed corpses in order to steal their organs. Emmett disfigured Tilden with a knife upon discovering his affair with Ramona, which produced Madeleine. Years later, Madeleine arranged the pornographic film featuring Short, which was shot in one of Emmett's houses. Tilden witnessed the shoot, became enamoured with Short and blackmailed Emmett and Madeleine, threatening to reveal the truth about Emmett's assault unless Madeleine arranged for him to go on a date with Short.

Aware that he cannot publicly expose Tilden and the Spragues' part in the Dahlia case lest he be convicted for suppression of evidence, Bucky tracks down Tilden and shoots him. The murder is seemingly solved, but Bucky is bugged by a discrepancy in the case files and goes to speak to Martha Sprague, from whom he discovers that Lee had actually worked out that Emmett and Madeleine's involvement in the first few days of the investigation and used this knowledge to blackmail Emmett for $100,000. Bucky is shocked to discover both Lee's duplicity and Kay's involvement in the scheme, having picked up the money. He confronts Kay, who is so ashamed that she leaves Los Angeles altogether.

Bucky bumps into Chambers' widow and learns that the clown painting of a character from the novel The Man Who Laughs. Remembering that a copy of that book was found at the shack where Short was killed, he discovers that Chambers bought the painting from Ramona. Ramona confesses to Bucky that she is the real murderer, having killed Short in a jealous rage when she learned of the arranged date between her and Tilden; she modeled her tortured of Short after the novel and persuaded Tilden to go along with it by offering to let him keep Short's organs; she subsequently sold the painting to Chambers "as an act of purging".

While vacillating about whether or not to arrest Ramona, Bucky discovers that Madeleine is once again dressing up as Short. Desperate to get his attention, she reveals to Bucky that she murdered Lee in disguise in order to retrieve the $100,000 he extorted from her father. Bucky arrests her and she is institutionalised; she gets revenge by revealing Bucky's suppression of evidence, causing him to be fired from the LAPD. Bucky does not disclose what he knows about Ramona, and the Dahlia case remains officially unsolved. Kay writes to Bucky telling him that she is pregnant, and the two reconcile. The novel ends with Bucky flying out to join Kay, and on the plane he prays for Short's spirit to watch over him in his new home – Boston, her birthplace.

Reception
The Black Dahlia was one of numerous neo-noir novels published in the late 1970s and 1980s. Ellroy was known as an author of crime fiction but this novel is considered to have gained him critical notice as a serious writer of literature.

Ellroy wrote three other novels in what he termed the L.A. Quartet, a cycle of novels set in 1940s and 1950s Los Angeles. He portrays the city in this period as a hotbed of political corruption and depravity. The Quartet continues with The Big Nowhere, L.A. Confidential, and White Jazz.

Film adaptation
The Black Dahlia was adapted for a 2006 film of the same name by director Brian De Palma. Starring Scarlett Johansson, Josh Hartnett and Aaron Eckhart, it was a critical and commercial failure, with the consensus being that it had been poorly made and acted. It was criticized as sometimes appearing incoherent. The latter fault may have been caused by De Palma's drastic editing of the finished product, which initially ran for three hours and he eventually cut down to two.

Graphic novel
In 2013, Matz and David Fincher adapted James Ellroy's novel into a comic called Le Dahlia noir, with Miles Hyman as the illustrator. Originally published in French, it was published in English in 2016 as The Black Dahlia: A Crime Graphic Novel.

Anachronisms
The Black Dahlia has several references to characters having been committed to Atascadero State Hospital, but this institution did not open until 1954. The character Madeleine is committed there (ch. 3–5), but the hospital's patient population was historically limited to men.

Madeleine tells her father she and Bucky met at an art show at Stanley Rose's bookstore. However, that store closed permanently eight years prior in 1939.

See also

 Black Dahlia – Details of the murder of Elizabeth Short.
 L.A. Quartet

References

External links
 Full summary of The Black Dahlia

1987 American novels
Novels by James Ellroy
American crime novels
American novels adapted into films
Fictional portrayals of the Los Angeles Police Department
Novels set in Los Angeles
Novels about boxing
Hollywood novels
Works about the Black Dahlia case